Fourqueux is a former commune in the Yvelines department in the Île-de-France in north-central France. On 1 January 2019, it was merged into the commune Saint-Germain-en-Laye. It is a small suburb 20 km west of Paris.

It is known for having a diverse community, due to the Lycée International being located in the neighboring town of Saint-Germain-en-Laye.  Fourqueux has received prizes for its flowers on the departmental and regional level every year since 2005.

Population
Fourqueux's population as of 2013 was 4,035 people composing 1,652 households. The average yearly income per household in 2009 was 72,741 euros, over twice the average of the Yvelines department as a whole.

See also
Communes of the Yvelines department

References

External links

 Town council website  (in French)

Former communes of Yvelines
Populated places disestablished in 2019